Sardana Platonovna Oyunskaya (September 6, 1934 – July 13, 2007) was a Yakut folklorist, literary critic, and philologist.

Oyunskaya was born in Moscow, the daughter of Platon Oyunsky. A graduate of Yakutsk State University, she began working at the Institute of Language, Literature and History in 1962. She authored a monograph on Yakut folk riddles, and co-authored publications on Yakut fairy tales and folk songs; she published numerous other works on Yakut folklore, language, and literature as well. Later in life she began to publish memoirs about her father and his associates; a book of her recollections of him was published in 1999, and republished in 2003.

References

1934 births
2007 deaths
Yakut people
Russian folklorists
Russian literary critics
Russian philologists
Women folklorists
Women literary critics
Russian women critics
Women philologists
20th-century Russian non-fiction writers
20th-century Russian women writers
20th-century philologists
21st-century Russian non-fiction writers
21st-century Russian women writers
21st-century philologists
Writers from Moscow
North-Eastern Federal University alumni
Yakut mythology